Beach daisy may refer to the following plant species:
Arctotheca populifolia
Erigeron glaucus
Melanthera biflora